Sabatinca aurella is a species of moth of the family Micropterigidae. It is endemic to New Zealand. The larvae of this species is variable in appearance but tends to be coloured yellow-green with greyish patches. The adults of the species have a pale golden appearance with silver or purple coloured bars on the forewings. The moth has an approximate wingspan of around 1cm. This species is found from the Coromandel Peninsula to the Fox Glacier and is on the wing from September to January. A larval host species is the liverwort Heteroscyphus lingulatus. The preferred habitat of this species is at higher altitudes than other New Zealand endemic species in this genus and it tends to prefer forest or sub alpine grass or scrubland.

Taxonomy 
This species was first described by George Hudson in 1918. Hudson used a specimen collected by R. M. Sunley at an altitude of 3000 ft in the Tararua Ranges. In 1923 Edward Meyrick placed this species within the Micropardalis genus. This placement was accepted by J. S. Dugdale in his 1988 publication Lepidoptera - annotated catalogue, and keys to family-group taxa. However G. W. Gibbs revised this combination in 2014 and placed this species within the Sabatinca genus. Meyrick had justified the placement of this species in the Micropardalis genus on the basis of the wing venation of that species. However Gibbs argued that a survey of wing venation across all Sabatinca species showed that a series existed and that S. aurella formed a part of that series. He therefore concluded that there was no longer any grounds for that generic distinction. The female lectotype specimen is held at the Museum of New Zealand Te Papa Tongarewa.

Description 

The larvae of this species is variable in appearance but tends to be coloured yellow-green with greyish patches.

Hudson described the adults of this species as follows:

A "pale shining golden" species, these moths have a forewing length of between 4.2 and 5.2mm. The wing patterns of S. aurella are regarded as being the most "straightforward" as compared to other New Zealand species in this genus. The forewing pattern is  similar to that of Sabatinca doroxena.

Distribution 
This species is endemic to New Zealand. It is one of New Zealand's most frequently encountered jaw-moths, this species is found from as far North as the Coromandel Peninsula to as far South as Fox Glacier.

Behaviour 
This species is on the wing from the beginning of September until the end of January. It is most common from mid-November to the end of December.

Host species and habitat 

A larval host species is the liverwort formerly known as Heteroscyphus normalis and now known as Heteroscyphus lingulatus. This species tends to prefer forest or subalpine grasslands or shrublands habitat at a higher altitude than other New Zealand endemic species within the genus Sabatinca.

References

Micropterigidae
Moths described in 1918
Moths of New Zealand
Endemic fauna of New Zealand
Taxa named by George Hudson
Endemic moths of New Zealand